Midway is an unincorporated community in Bossier Parish, Louisiana, United States.

References

Unincorporated communities in Bossier Parish, Louisiana
Unincorporated communities in Louisiana
Unincorporated communities in Shreveport – Bossier City metropolitan area
Populated places in Ark-La-Tex